The Speed of Now Part 1 is the eleventh studio album by New Zealand-born Australian country music singer Keith Urban. The album was released on 18 September 2020 via Hit Red and Capitol Records Nashville.

The album won the Highest Selling Album at the 2021 Queensland Music Awards.

Track listing

Note

Personnel
Adapted from liner notes.

"Out the Cage"
Jamareo Artis – bass guitar
Breland – featured vocals, choir, background vocals
Jamie Muhoberac – keyboards
Nile Rodgers – electric guitar
Sean Small – acoustic guitar, electric guitar, keyboards, programming
Sam Sumsor – acoustic guitar, electric guitar, keyboards, programming
Keith Urban – acoustic guitar, electric guitar, ganjo, lead vocals

"One Too Many"
Nathan Barlowe – gang vocals, handclaps
Daniel Davidson – bass guitar, acoustic guitar, electric guitar, keyboards, programming
Jerry Flowers – gang vocals, handclaps
Mich Hansen – percussion
Boy Matthews – background vocals
Pink – featured vocals
Cleo Tighe – background vocals
Keith Urban – acoustic guitar, electric guitar, lead vocals
Peter Wallevik – keyboards, piano, programming

"Live With"
Johnny Fung – acoustic guitar, electric guitar, programming
Evan Hutchings – drums
Zach Kale – acoustic guitar, electric guitar, keyboards, programming, background vocals
Jimmie Lee Sloas – bass guitar
Keith Urban – acoustic guitar, electric guitar, lead vocals, background vocals
Alex Wright – keyboards

"Superman"
Nathan Barlowe – keyboards
Ben Berger – bass guitar, keyboards, programming, background vocals
Nathan Chapman – bass guitar
Ryan McMahon – acoustic guitar, electric guitar, bass guitar, keyboards, programming, background vocals
Ryan Rabin – acoustic guitar, electric guitar, bass guitar, keyboards, programming, background vocals
Jerry Roe – drums
Keith Urban – acoustic guitar, electric guitar, keyboards, slide guitar, lead vocals

"Change Your Mind"
Matthew Koma – acoustic guitar, electric guitar, banjo, keyboards, drums, background vocals
Wendy Molvion – bass guitar
Keith Urban – electric guitar solo, lead vocals

"Forever"
Dave Cohen – Hammond B-3 organ
Dann Huff – electric guitar, percussion, programming
Jerry Roe – drums
Jimmie Lee Sloas – bass guitar
Russell Terrell – background vocals
Keith Urban – acoustic guitar, electric guitar, lead vocals, background vocals

"Say Something"
Jeppe Bilsby – keyboards, programming
Benni Christiansen – bass guitar
Oliver Cliwik – electric guitar
Mich Hansen – percussion
Scott Quinn – background vocals
Keith Urban – 12-string acoustic guitar, electric guitar, lead vocals, background vocals

"Soul Food"
Breland – background vocals
Jamie Muhoberac – keyboards
Jimmie Lee Sloas – bass guitar
Sean Small – keyboards, programming
Sam Sumsor – keyboards, programming
Keith Urban – acoustic guitar, electric guitar, lead vocals, background vocals

"Ain't It Like a Woman"
Evan Hutchings – drums
Jaren Johnston – background vocals
Jimmie Lee Sloas – bass guitar
Keith Urban – electric guitar, lead vocals, background vocals
Alex Wright – pedal steel guitar, piano

"With You"
Nathan Chapman – bass guitar
Nate Cyphert – background vocals
Luke Niccoli – electric guitar, keyboards, programming
Jerry Roe – drums, percussion
Keith Urban – acoustic guitar, electric guitar, ganjo, lead vocals, background vocals

"Tumbleweed"
Lewis Burns – didgeridoo
Nathan Chapman – bass guitar
Josh Ditty – programming
Jaren Johnston – electric guitar, percussion, programming, background vocals
Jamie Muhoberac – keyboards, synthesizer
Jerry Roe – drums, percussion
Keith Urban – electric guitar solo, ganjo, lead vocals, background vocals

"God Whispered Your Name"
Chris August – keyboards, Wurlitzer, background vocals
Matt Chamberlain – drums, percussion
Jamie Muhoberac – synthesizer
Pino Palladino – bass guitar
Benmont Tench – Hammond B-3 organ, piano, Wurlitzer
Keith Urban – acoustic guitar, electric guitar, lead vocals, background vocals

"Polaroid"
Nathan Chapman – bass guitar
Dave Cohen – keyboards
Joey Moi – programming
Jerry Roe – drums, percussion
Ilya Toshinsky – acoustic guitar
Mark Trussell – programming
Keith Urban – banjo, electric guitar, all vocals

"Better Than I Am"
Keith Urban – acoustic guitar, electric guitar, all vocals
Eg White – bass guitar, keyboards, piano, drums, programming

"We Were"
Eric Church – duet vocals (track 16 version)
Dave Cohen – keyboards, synthesizer
Dann Huff – electric guitar
Charlie Judge – synthesizer
Jerry Roe – drums, percussion
Jimmie Lee Sloas – bass guitar
Russell Terrell – background vocals
Keith Urban – acoustic guitar, electric guitar, banjo, lead vocals, background vocals

Technical
 Rochel Trlivieng – art director, design
 Kera Jackson – art producer
 Ally Gecewicz – assistant, editing
 Spencer Clarke – assistant, engineer
 Nicolas Weilmann – assistant, engineer
 Drew Bollman – assistant
 Brendan Dekora – assistant
 Michelle Freetly – assistant
 Zach Kuhlman – assistant
 Kam Luchterhand – assistant
 Matt Wolach – assistant
 Mark Dobson – digital editing, engineer
 Scott Cooke – editing
 Eiving Nordland – editing
 Chris Small – editing
 John Hanes – engineer, mixing
 Captain Cuts – engineer, producer
 Josh Ditty – engineer
 Jeff Balding – engineer
 Joe Baldridge – engineer
 Ed Cherney – engineer
 Russel Graham – engineer
 Elthon Mendoza – engineer
 Marco Sonzini – engineer
 Tremaine "Six7" Williams – engineer
 Dan McCarroll – executive producer, producer
 Randy Merrill – mastering
 Joey Moi – mixing, producer
 Rich Costey – mixing
 Serban Ghenea – mixing
 Justin Nielbank – mixing
 Mark "Spike" Stent – mixing
 Spike Stent – mixing
 Russ Harrington – photography
 Scott Johnson – production coordination

Charts

Weekly charts

Year-end charts

Certifications and sales

Release history

References

2020 albums
Keith Urban albums
Capitol Records albums